Amballur  is a suburban region of Kochi in the Indian state of Kerala.

Demographics
 India census, Amballur had a population of 11757 with 5763 males and 5994 females.

Location
Amballoor is located about 20 km from the downtown Kochi. It is a part of the Amballoor Panchayath, which forms the south edge of Ernakulam district. Amballoor comes in the Ernakulam - Thalayolaparambu main road.

Amballoor Pallithazham is the main junction of Amballoor. Main temples in this area are Amballur Kavu and  Koote Kavu, both of which are Bhagavathi. Amballoor thrikkovu is another main temple, it is a Krishna temple. The St. Francis Assissi Syro-Malabar Catholic church established in 1810, is at this junction. The St, Francis UP school is the first school of this place. The school celebrated its centenary year recently.

Perumpilly, Arakkunnam, Kanjiramattom, Edakkattuvayal are a few places adjacent to Amballoor.

References

Villages in Ernakulam district